Rachele Mussolini  (b.1973/1974) is an Italian politician and a councillor in Rome for the far-right Brothers of Italy party since 2016 and is an active member of the party. She has been serving two consecutive terms as a councillor in Rome. She is the granddaughter of fascist politician Benito Mussolini and Rachele Mussolini and sister of Alessandra Mussolini.

Political career 
Rachele Mussolini joined politics in 2016, being elected as a councillor for the far-right party Brothers of Italy.

In 2018 as part of her efforts turned part tour guide promoting a history tour called "Duce! The Rise and Fall of Italian Fascism" in her hometown, Predappio, run by historical tours. The tour had sold out, tickets had cost around $5,772 per individual.

In October 2021, Rachele was re-elected to the municipal council of Rome with the most votes. With counting done in more than 97 percent of polling stations, Mussolini garnered more than 8,200 preference votes after standing for the hard-right Brothers of Italy party.

Media appearances 

She has appeared across different media platforms across the world including countries such as Italy, India, United States of America and in outlets across Europe and more.

Personal life 
She is the daughter of the jazz musician Romano Mussolini, the fourth child of the Italian fascist prime minister Benito Mussolini and is named after Rachele Mussolini the second wife of Benito Mussolini. Her sister Alessandra Mussolini has served as a member of parliament in Italy representing Forza Italia party.

References

1974 births
Living people
Brothers of Italy politicians
Mussolini family
Politicians from Rome